Idem sonans is a legal doctrine whereby a person's identity is presumed known despite the misspelling of his or her name. The presumption lies in the similarity between the phonology, or sounds of the correct name and the name as written.  Such similar-sounding words are called a homonym, while similar-sounding phrases or names would be a holorime.

In Latin it means "sounding the same."  Some examples are Seagrave/Segrave, Hutson/Hudson, Coonrad/Conrad, Keen/Keene, and Diadema/Deadema.

United Kingdom
Under UK jurisdiction, there has been little judicial activity in this area. The old judgment of R v Davis provides:
"If two names spelt differently necessarily sound alike, the court may, as matter of law, pronounce them to be idem sonantia; but if they do not necessarily sound alike, the question whether they are idem sonantia is a question of fact for the jury".
The modern case of Re Vidiofusion Ltd establishes a four-stage test when a name of a company is spelled differently in writing:
 No company of a similar name
 Idem Sonantia - similar pronunciation
 No marked vision difference (judge gave example of Jackson/Jaxon being too dissimilar visually)
 Misspelling does not substantially change the placement of the name if placed in an alphabetical list.

United States

Remnants of this common law doctrine exist today in the United States in the Uniform Commercial Code.  Name changes can mislead searchers of official records of titles or liens.  Article 9 of the UCC states that a financing statement shall not perfect a valid security interest if a name change would be "seriously misleading.". A creditor may gain priority over other creditors in the event of a bankruptcy by filing a financing statement.  The financing statement contains information relevant to the secured transaction and puts other creditors on notice that the filer has a secured interest in the property.  Should the filer use a debtor name that is substantially different from the debtor's actual name, the purpose of filing the financing statement is defeated.  On the other hand, if there is a minor difference in spelling or an idem sonans, the error is not fatal, but only if it is not seriously misleading.  The actual search results may reveal a debtor with a similar name and address which would put the researcher on notice to investigate further, which is the purpose of the filing in the first place.  The legal effect of an idem sonans is that the minor name difference shall have no bearing on the priority of debtors.

There is some movement away from this doctrine under modern New York Common law, especially in Conveyancing.  That means that a creditor filing a judgment lien or a title abstract company searching title to real property by a deed filed in an office of a county clerk must search by exact name, and can not rely on idem sonans.

California is also showing movement from this common law doctrine in transfer of property. The court held that for the "purposes of identification" the doctrine applies, but refused to allow it in the transfer of real property.  New Hampshire Supreme Court in 1994 took a stance on this doctrine and said "We concur with the court in Orr that "the simple alternative is to require [attachment creditors] simply to spell the names of their ... debtors properly.""

See also
Identification (disambiguation)
Notary public
Acknowledgment (law)
Affirmation
Genealogy
Real property
Title search

References

Civil law (common law)
Documents
Property law
Latin legal terminology